West Valley City is a city in Salt Lake County and a suburb of Salt Lake City in the U.S. state of Utah. The population was 140,230 at the 2020 census,
making it the second-largest city in Utah. The city incorporated in 1980 from a large, quickly growing unincorporated area, combining the four communities of Granger, Hunter, Chesterfield, and Redwood. It is home to the Maverik Center and USANA Amphitheatre.

History
The earliest known residents of the western Salt Lake Valley were Native American bands of the Ute and Shoshoni tribes.

The first European people to live in the area were the Latter-day Saints. The Euro-Americans arrived in the Salt Lake Valley in 1847. The area was first staked out by settler Joseph Harker and his family in the area they named as "over Jordan" (referring to the land west of the Jordan River, which runs through the valley).

The Granger area was settled by Welsh pioneers who had come to Utah with Dan Jones in 1849. Irrigation systems and agriculture were developed in the area, and it was Elias Smith who proposed the area's name on account of its successful farming. Granger and vicinity had about 1,000 people in 1930.

Hunter was not settled until 1876. This settlement was started by Rasmus Nielson, Edward Rushton, August Larsen and about seven others along with their families. Irrigation began in 1881 and the main crop was fruit trees.

The city began to experience rapid growth in the 1970s, when the area that is now West Valley City consisted of the four separate communities of Hunter, Granger, Chesterfield, and Redwood. These four unincorporated areas merged in 1980 to form the present-day city. During the 2002 Olympic Winter Games, West Valley City was the official venue for men's and women's ice hockey.

On May 19, 2011, the city unveiled an official plan to create a downtown area for the city over the course of 10 years, building on plans and development that already existed. The center will include a civic center (consisting of city hall, a courthouse, police headquarters, and a library), an eight-story Embassy Suites hotel, a plaza, and residential development, as well as the end of the TRAX Green Line, and a stop on the 3500 South MAX bus rapid transit line. Valley Fair Mall and the Maverik Center are located nearby, as is I-215.  of the development is incomplete, with the TRAX line having opened in 2011 and the hotel in 2012, but the City Hall and government center are under construction.

Serial killer Ted Bundy was arrested in Granger on August 16, 1975, on a routine traffic stop.

Geography
According to the United States Census Bureau, the city has a total area of 35.5 square miles (91.8 km2), of which 35.4 square miles (91.7 km2) is land and 0.1 square miles (0.2 km2) (0.17%) is water.

West Valley is located on the northwest side of the Salt Lake Valley between Salt Lake City on the north, South Salt Lake on the east, Magna Township on the west, and Taylorsville and Kearns Township on the south. The Oquirrh Mountains loom over the city to the west, while the Jordan River marks the eastern boundary.

Government

West Valley City has a nonpartisan, strong city manager form of government, which means that the city manager is analogous to a corporation's CEO, while the mayor fills a role similar to chairman of the board, with the City Council acting as the "board". The mayor is a voting member of the City Council. The West Valley City Council meets each Tuesday night at 6:30 PM, except fifth Tuesdays. City Hall is located at 3600 South Constitution Boulevard.

The mayor and six councilors are elected to four-year terms. Mayoral elections are held the same year as three of the councilors. The other three councilors are staggered two years from the mayoral. Two council seats are at-large, or citywide, and the remaining four seats represent districts of approximately 28,000 residents. Officials are not subject to term limits. , the most recent election was held in November, 2013.

In the Utah State Legislature, West Valley City is in Senate Districts 1, 3, 5, and 12 represented by Democrat Luz Robles, Democrat Gene Davis, Democrat Karen Mayne, and Republican Daniel Thatcher and House Districts 30, 31, and 33, represented by Republican Fred Cox, Republican Sophia DiCaro, and Republican Craig Hall. Federally, West Valley City lies in the 2nd and 4th congressional districts, represented by Republican Chris Stewart and Democrat Ben McAdams.

Police 

The West Valley City Police Department (WVCPD) provides law enforcement services to the city.  the police chief is Colleen Jacobs, a 21 year veteran of the department, who oversees 218 sworn officers and 47 support staff.

In 2013, the city police's narcotics unit was disbanded after an officer-involved critical incident revealed drugs and money had not been booked into evidence. Officers in the unit were also found to be keeping change and small items from seized vehicles, and placing tracking devices on potential suspects' vehicles without warrants.

In 2016, Officer Cody Brotherson was killed in the line of duty, the department's only such fatality.

In 2019, an officer shot and killed a handcuffed man who was attempting to pull an officer's gun out of its holster: this killing was found legally justified by the district attorney.

Demographics

According to estimates from the U.S. Census Bureau, as of 2018, there were 136,401 people in West Valley City. The racial makeup of the city was 46.5% non-Hispanic White, 2.3% Black, 1.1% Native American, 6.0% Asian, 3.9% Pacific Islander, and 4.2% from two or more races. 38.1% of the population were Hispanic or Latino of any race.

As of the census of 2010, there were 129,480 people, 38,535 households, and 34,900 families residing in the city. The population density was 3,647.32 people per square mile (2,266.35/km2). There were 38,978 housing units at an average density of 1,097.97 per square mile (682.25/km2). The racial makeup of the city was 65.37% White, 1.96% African American, 1.26% Native American, 4.97% Asian, 3.64% Pacific Islander, 18.96% from other races, and 3.85% from two or more races. Hispanic or Latino of any race were 33.13% of the population.

There were 38,535 households, out of which 47.1% had children under the age of 18 living with them, 61.3% were married couples living together, 13.2% had a female householder with no husband present, and 19.6% were non-families. 14.7% of all households were made up of individuals, and 3.9% had someone living alone who was 65 years of age or older. The average household size was 3.36 and the average family size was 3.71.

In the city, the population was spread out, with 33.7% under the age of 18, 12.9% from 18 to 24, 30.7% from 25 to 44, 17.4% from 45 to 64, and 5.4% who were 65 years of age or older. The median age was 27 years. For every 100 females, there were 102.3 males. For every 100 females age 18 and over, there were 100.5 males.

The median income for a household in the city was $45,773, and the median income for a family was $48,593. Males had a median income of $32,116 versus $22,693 for females. The per capita income for the city was $15,031. About 6.7% of families and 8.7% of the population were below the poverty line, including 11.0% of those under age 18 and 3.5% of those age 65 or over.

Economy
Companies based in West Valley City include Backcountry.com, C.R. England, FranklinCovey, and USANA Health Sciences.

Top employers
According to the City's 2017 Comprehensive Annual Financial Report, these are the top employers in the city:

Education
The city lies in the Granite School District. It has 21 elementary schools, four junior high schools, and two high schools - Granger Senior High, which opened in 1958, and Hunter, which opened in 1990. The city is also the location of East Hollywood High School, a charter school specializing in film education and American Preparatory Academy.

Transportation

West Valley City is on the same address grid system as Salt Lake City, and therefore also follows the same street numbering system. I-215 runs through eastern portions of the city parallel to I-15, which lies farther east of the city. The SR-201 freeway lies along the northern border with Salt Lake City and continues west into Magna as an expressway. Bangerter Highway, which runs south from Salt Lake City International Airport, traverses the approximate center of the city as well on its way to serving the rapidly growing western and southern ends of the valley. The Mountain View Corridor will also run through the western portion of the city. The city also is served by several bus routes operated by the Utah Transit Authority, and an intermodal transportation hub located in the city center near Valley Fair Mall and the Maverik Center. In addition to local bus routes, the West Valley Intermodal Hub is serviced by TRAX light rail and MAX bus rapid transit (BRT) lines. The 3500 South MAX BRT line began service in 2008 and the TRAX Green Line to the intermodal hub was completed and began service in 2011.

Sports and entertainment

West Valley City is home to the Maverik Center and the Utah Grizzlies of the ECHL along with the Salt Lake City Stars of the NBA G League. It is also home to the Utah Cultural Celebration Center, Stonebridge Golf Course, The Ridge Golf Course, Rocky Mountain Raceways, USANA Amphitheatre, and the Valley Fair Mall.
WVC is also home to The Drive-in.

Neighborhoods

Chesterfield, Redwood, Westshire, East Granger (84119)
The Eastern side of West Valley City consists of the Redwood, Chesterfield and East Granger neighborhoods. The neighborhood population in 2013 was 54,832. This area of West Valley City has a median household income of $42,512, which is lower when compared to the rest of the city and region. The neighborhood's racial makeup was 51.17% White, 35.08% Hispanic or Latino, 4.73% Asian, 3.24% Native Hawaiian and Other Pacific Islander and 2.51% African-American.

Much of Eastern West Valley's residential architecture is based on common brick ranch styles from the 1960s and 1970s. To the north of Parkway Boulevard exists a significant number of light industrial development. South of Parkway is mostly residential and commercial, including Valley Fair Mall and the Maverik Center. The Westshire neighborhood is located directly south of Valley Fair Mall and consists of 160 homes built by modernist architect Ron Molen. This neighborhood is unique in that all homes were built in the 1960s and 1970s in the Mid-Century Modern style and are excellent examples of modernist residential architecture. West Valley City planners are currently developing a planned mass-transit anchored Downtown area near the Valley Fair Mall with the emergence of the Fairbourne Station as a gathering place and revitalization of the mall.

West Granger, Hunter, Lakepark (84120)
The Central portion of West Valley City consists of the West Granger and Hunter, south of 3100 South, with the Lakepark and Westlake Business Park commercial and office developments taking up the majority of the space north of 3100 South. The neighborhood population in 2013 was 49,107. This area of West Valley City has a median household income of $55,087, which is typical for the state of Utah and Northern Salt Lake County. The neighborhood's racial makeup was 53.82% White, 32.11% Hispanic or Latino, 5.04% Asian, 4.54% Native Hawaiian and Other Pacific Islander and 1.57% African-American.

Much of Central West Valley's residential architecture is based on common brick ranch styles from the 1960s and 1970s. The Highbury planned development is currently being established in the northwestern portion of this area. This is a large planned mixed residential and commercial area with a large pond and many casual restaurants in a walk-able district near 5600 West.

West Hunter, Woodhaven, Oquirrh (84128)
The western portion of West Valley City consists of the West Hunter, Woodhaven, and Oquirrh neighborhoods. The neighborhood population in 2013 was 28,475. This area of West Valley City has a median household income of $64,356, which is slightly higher than the median for both the state of Utah and Salt Lake County. The neighborhood's racial makeup was 60.65% White, 29.62% Hispanic or Latino, 3.15% Asian, 2.37% Native Hawaiian and Other Pacific Islander and 1.39% African-American.

Much of western West Valley's residential architecture is based on 1990s and 2000s planned developments. The majority of the neighborhood is residential, with the exception of many strip-mall style commercial developments along its eastern border of 5600 West. The city's master plan calls for a Hunter Town Center development near the intersection of 5600 West and 3500 South, but no structures have yet been developed specifically for this. This side of West Valley City is also home to USANA Amphitheater, though it technically shares the 84118 zip code with Kearns and Taylorsville, rather than West Valley City.

Key to the City
West Valley City has presented the Key to the city to several visiting dignitaries. Past recipients have included Mayor Yéah Samaké of Ouélessébougou, Mali; Governor of Chiapas Juan Sabines Guerrero; and United States Secretary of State Hillary Clinton. The key was awarded to Tongan queen mother Halaevalu Mataʻaho ʻAhomeʻe on July 28, 2011, when she visited the city for the rededication of the Tongan United Methodist Church. It was also presented by Mayor Mike Winder on December 14, 2011 to Axl Rose of Guns N' Roses when they performed in the Maverik Center the day after it was announced that the band was to be inducted into the Rock and Roll Hall of Fame.

Sister cities
West Valley City has sister cities, as designated by Sister Cities International:
  Nantou, Nantou, Taiwan Province, Republic of China (Taiwan)
  Boca del Río, Veracruz, Mexico

Notable people

 Anton Palepoi, former defensive end with the Seattle Seahawks
 Matt Asiata, former running back with the Minnesota Vikings
 John Madsen, former NFL tight end for the Cleveland Browns
 Naufahu Tahi, former NFL full back
 Khyiris Tonga, nose tackle for the Atlanta Falcons 
 Ray Feinga, NFL offensive tackle
 Tadd Gadduang, finalist, So You Think You Can Dance
 SHeDAISY 
 Susan Powell, woman missing since 2009, last seen in West Valley City

See also
 Salt Lake City metropolitan area
 Granger-Hunter, a census-designated place delineated within the area in 1970.

References

External links

 West Valley City official website
 Chamber of Commerce/Tourism website
 The Magna Times Weekly Newspaper - West Valley News, Magna and Kearns

 
Cities in Utah
Salt Lake City metropolitan area
1980 establishments in Utah
Populated places established in 1980
Wasatch Front
Cities in Salt Lake County, Utah